This article includes the entire 2016 Democratic Party presidential primary schedule in a format that includes result tabulation. Below are the vote totals for everyone that appeared on the ballot during the 2016 Democratic presidential primaries. Two candidates, Bernie Sanders and Hillary Clinton, appeared on all 57 ballots. Two others, Martin O'Malley and Rocky De La Fuente, appeared in over 30 states and six others appeared on between two and ten states. Nearly 20 appeared on only New Hampshire's ballot. As of June 8, Hillary Clinton was considered the presumptive nominee according to media organizations. On July 26, the second day of the Democratic National Convention, Clinton was confirmed the Democratic nominee for the 2016 United States presidential election.

Overview

Major candidates
The following are the results of candidates that have won at least one state. These candidates are on the ballots for every state, territory, and federal district contest. The results of caucuses do not always have attached preference polls and attendance can be extremely limited. The unpledged delegate count may not always reflect the latest declared preferences. Results are collected by The New York Times. For explanations of the various types of primaries see primary elections in the United States.

Detailed results

February

Iowa 

 Precinct caucuses: February 1
 County conventions: March 12
 District conventions: April 30
 State convention: June 18

New Hampshire

Nevada

South Carolina

Super Tuesday

Alabama

Arkansas

American Samoa

Colorado

Georgia

Massachusetts

Minnesota

Oklahoma

Tennessee

Texas

Virginia

Vermont

Early March

Kansas

Louisiana

Nebraska

Maine

Democrats Abroad

Michigan

Mississippi

Northern Mariana Islands

Late March

Florida

Illinois

Missouri

North Carolina

Ohio

Arizona

Idaho

Utah

Alaska

Hawaii

Washington

April

Wisconsin

Wyoming

New York

Connecticut

Delaware

Maryland

Pennsylvania

Rhode Island

May

Indiana

Guam

West Virginia

Kentucky

Oregon

June

Virgin Islands

Puerto Rico

California

Montana

New Jersey

New Mexico

North Dakota

South Dakota

District of Columbia

See also 
 Results of the 2016 Republican Party presidential primaries
 2016 Libertarian Party presidential primaries

Notes

References

2016 United States Democratic presidential primaries
Democratic Party presidential primaries, 2016